UII may refer to:

 Unione Induista Italia, a Hindu association in Italy
 Islamic University of Indonesia (Universitas Islam Indonesia)
 Unique Ingredient Identifier
 Unique Item Identifier, see Item Unique Identification
 Útila Airport, serving Útila, Bay Islands, Honduras